Save Britain's Heritage (styled as SAVE Britain's Heritage) is a British charity, created in 1975 by a group of journalists, historians, architects, and planners to campaign publicly for endangered historic buildings. It is also active on the broader issues of preservation policy. SAVE Britain's Heritage is a registered charity governed by a board of trustees.

Through press releases, leaflets, reports, books, and exhibitions, SAVE Britain's Heritage champions the cause of decaying country houses, redundant churches and chapels, disused mills and warehouses, cottages and town halls, railway stations, hospitals, military buildings, and asylums. 

SAVE Britain's Heritage was the first organization to campaign for the introduction of the Thirty-Year Rule, which now makes outstanding post-war buildings in England and Wales eligible for listing.

Goals
SAVE Britain's Heritage fights to protect British historic buildings from demolition or careless alteration. SAVE receives no statutory funding. The organisation is sustained by private donations from a range of individual and charitable donors.

The charity aims to:
Awaken public interest in and public appreciation of Britain's architectural heritage.
To encourage the study of that heritage and related matters and to promote high standards of planning and architecture.
To save from needless destruction or disfigurement, buildings or groups of buildings and designed landscapes of special historic or architectural interest.
Where necessary, and with expert advice, take legal action to prevent major and needless losses.

Achievements and failures
SAVE Britain's Heritage always placed a special emphasis on the possibilities of alternative uses for historic buildings and has, on a number of occasions, prepared its own schemes for the re-use of threatened buildings. On repeated occasions, its proposals were instrumental in giving threatened buildings a renewed lease on life. 

Many of its campaigns altered the way conservation now protects Britain's built heritage. SAVE Britain's Heritage'''s attack on insensitive shop fronts contained guidelines now adopted by many local planning authorities, and SAVE Britain's Heritage was the first organization to campaign for the introduction of the Thirty-Year Rule, which now makes outstanding post-war buildings in England and Wales eligible for listing.  SAVE Britain's Heritage was instrumental in saving buildings such as: 
Calke Abbey in Derbyshire, acquired by the National Trust in 1983;
The Grange, Northington in Hampshire—the surviving parts were acquired and restored by English Heritage;
Peninsula Barracks in Winchester—converted to private residential use in 1998; and
Tyntesfield—acquired by the National Trust in 2002.
Brandon railway station in Suffolk, in 2020.

It also established charitable trusts to restore the following:
All Souls Church, Halifax, a church by George Gilbert Scott; 
Bank Hall, Bretherton, a Jacobean mansion, built from handmade brick for the Bannastre Family in 1608;
Barlaston Hall in Staffordshire, a Palladian villa by Sir Robert Taylor; and
6 Palace Street; the oldest building in Caernarfon outside the castle.

However, campaigns are not always successful. Its campaign in 1977–1978 to save the Baltic Exchange building and its collection for the nation failed as it was unable to stop the demolition of historic buildings in the City of London to make way for the new Baltic Exchange and could not prevent the disposal of the interior of the Baltic Exchange, which had been damaged by a Provisional Irish Republican Army bomb in 1992. It has previously campaigned to save the General Market Buildings of Smithfield Market on Farringdon Road and the Royal Aircraft Establishment in Farnborough. As of October 2022, it is currently campaigning to protect Marks & Spencer's Marble Arch store on Oxford Street. SAVE has since taken the case to a public inquiry at Westminster City Hall, after being called in by Secretary of State, Michael Gove in June 2022.

SAVE's Buildings at Risk Register
SAVE maintains an electronic register, first created in 1989, of over 1400 "Buildings at Risk" and publishes a print catalogue of the register annually. The BaR, as it is also known, includes information on threatened unlisted and Grade II listed buildings (outside London) throughout England, Scotland and Wales. Buildings are considered to be 'at risk' if they are under threat from demolition or neglect.

The register is continuously updated: newly identified 'at risk' buildings are added, while others are removed either after restoration or demolition. The register also summarises the 'development history' of each building, detailing the progress of any restoration or other proposals.

Publications
Save Britain's Heritage has published many campaigning books and leaflets, including: The Concrete Jerusalem (1976),Elysian Gardens (1979),Vanishing London: A Catalogue of Decay (1979),The Fall of Zion (1980)Lost Houses of Scotland (1980)The Country House: To Be or Not To Be (1982)Estates Villages Who Cares? (1983)
 Crisis at Saltaire (1986)Pavilions in Peril (1987)Bright Future: The Reuse of Industrial Buildings (1990)
 Stop the Destruction of Bucklesbury (1992)
 Beacons of Learning (1995)
 Mind over Matter (1995)
 Silence in Court (2004)
 The Guildhall Testimonial (2006)
 The Big Saves: Heroic transformations of great landmarks (2016)
 Too good to lose: Historic schools at risk (2018)
 Canterbury Take Care! (2019)
 Departing Stores: Emporia at Risk (2022)

These publications advocate the preservation and reuse of, amongst other things, nonconformist chapels, redundant Anglican churches, Victorian mental hospitals, country houses, their gardens and outbuildings, and industrial buildings.SAVE Britain's Heritage'' also publishes an action guide, to assist campaigners with setting up their own groups to advocate the case for particular buildings. An exhibition highlighting the first 30 years of its work was held at the Victoria and Albert Museum in 2005.

See also
Society for the Protection of Ancient Buildings

References

External links
 
 SAVE Britain's Heritage 1975-2005: 30 Years of Campaigning, V&A

Historic preservation
Organizations established in 1975
Cultural heritage of the United Kingdom
British architectural history
Architecture groups
1975 establishments in the United Kingdom
Heritage organisations in the United Kingdom
Cultural charities based in the United Kingdom
Clubs and societies in the United Kingdom
Architecture organisations based in the United Kingdom
Arts organisations based in the United Kingdom
Historical societies of the United Kingdom
Charities based in London